There exists also another river named Aurach that is a tributary of the Regnitz, see Aurach (Regnitz, Mittelfranken). For other uses, see Aurach (disambiguation).

Aurach is a river of Bavaria, Germany. It is a left tributary of the Regnitz in Upper Franconia.

The Aurach has its source in the Steigerwald Nature Park west of the village of Oberaurach, between Euerberg and Beerberg. The Aurach first flows in eastern and then in south-eastern direction, through, among others, the districts Priesendorf and Walsdorf of Oberaurach. Its mouth into the Regnitz is downstream from Stegaurach, just north of Pettstadt and somewhat south of Bamberg.

The river runs in the north parallel to the Rauhe Ebrach, which flows into the Regnitz just one kilometer southwards of the Aurach, and in the south parallel to the Main, which flows in the opposite direction.

See also
List of rivers of Bavaria

References

Rivers of Bavaria
Rivers of Germany